Cool Mules is a podcast by Canadaland about a cocaine-smuggling ring led by Slava Pastuk that operated within Vice Media.

It won a National Magazine Awards Gold Award for best podcast in 2021.

Production 
Cool Mules was produced and co-written by Jesse Brown; Kasia Mychajlowycz was the host, reporter and producer, Jonathan Goldsbie did research, Nathan Burley did the music, and Chandra Bulucon did the sound design and mixing.

It was released in six parts, the first of which was released on March 2, 2020.

Synopsis 
The podcast tells the story of Toronto-based Yaroslav Pastukhov/Slava Pastuk, a Vice Media music editor who goes by the pseudonym of Slava P. The story takes placed between 2014 and 2016, in which Slava P recruits younger Vice employees into an international cocaine-smuggling ring.

Themes in the podcast include the gig-economy, worker exploitation, and the line between journalists reporting news and creating news.

Critical reception 

In 2021, Cool Mules won a Digital Publishing Awards Gold Award for best podcast (arts & culture) from the National Magazine Awards.

Maxine Betteridge-Moes writing for Smack Media described the podcast as refreshing and fascinating. Lizzy Steiner, writing in CrimeReads writes "host Kasia Mychajlowycz painstaking unpacks a crime that seems custom-built for the millennial generation."

US corporation Storied Media Group bought the rights to the story.

See also 

 Bad Trips, 2022 by Slava Pastuk about the same subject.

References

External links 

 Cool Mules podcast official website
 Sean Craig and Adrian Humphreys, How a former editor allegedly used Vice Canada to recruit drug mules for a global smuggling ring, The National Post, 2 February 2017

Canadian podcasts
Crime podcasts
Works about drug traffickers
Works about the illegal drug trade
2020 podcast debuts